is a district located in Saitama, Japan.

As of October 1, 2004, the district has an estimated population of 79,096. The total area is 163.10 km2.

There are three towns located side by side with the city of Honjō.
Kamikawa
Kamisato
Misato

Municipal Timeline
On January 1, 2006 the village of Kamiizumi merged with the old town of Kamikawa to form the new town of Kamikawa
On January 10, 2006 the town of Kodama merged with the old city of Honjō to form the new city of Honjō.

Districts in Saitama Prefecture